Säässaare  is a village in Põlva Parish, Põlva County in southeastern Estonia.

The lake Lahojärv is located on the territory of Säässaare village.

References

 

Villages in Põlva County